Asiyah can refer to:

 Asiya, wife of the Pharaoh, foster-mother of Moses
 Assiah